The House of Commons Standing Committee on Veterans Affairs (ACVA) is a standing committee of the House of Commons of Canada. It was established in the 39th Canadian Parliament.

Mandate
The mandate and management of Veterans Affairs Canada and related agencies
Commemorative military celebrations in the near future
Review of the delivery of front-line health services for Canadian veterans

Membership

Subcommittees
Subcommittee on Agenda and Procedure (SACV)
Subcommittee on Trudeau

References
Standing Committee on Veterans Affairs (ACVA)

Veterans
Veterans' affairs in Canada